Aaron John O'Connell (born April 8, 1986) is an American model and actor. O'Connell is best known for his portrayal of Wyatt Cryer in the prime time television drama The Haves and the Have Nots which airs on the Oprah Winfrey Network.

Early life
O'Connell is the only son of Mark O'Connell, a former player for the Cincinnati Bengals and Kathryn Deeble O'Connell. He has three sisters, Amy, Abby and Anna.
He graduated from Cathedral High School in 2004 where he played football, basketball and baseball. As a child, his maternal grandfather Wayne taught him how to play the piano. In 2008, O'Connell graduated from Purdue University's College of Health and Human Sciences where he received a bachelor's degree in Health and Fitness.

Personal life
O'Connell became engaged to his girlfriend, model Natalie Pack on September 4, 2017.  The couple were married on July 21, 2018 at Lake Como in Italy.

In 2013, he gained his private pilot’s license, and flies a Cirrus SR22.

Career

Modeling
In 2006, O'Connell signed to Ford Models while still in college. He has been featured in major publications like GQ, Vanity Fair, Vogue, Vogue Paris, Arena Homme +, VMAN. O'Connell has also represented brands like Abercrombie & Fitch, Hanes, Lucky Jeans, Ralph Lauren, Champion and Jockey.

Acting
Starting his career at the Actors Studio in Chicago, O'Connell permanently relocated to Los Angeles so he could continue modeling, and start acting. O'Connell started acting classes. He eventually booked several commercials, including the Liquid-Plumr where he caught the eye of Tyler Perry. O'Connell initially thought it was a joke when he was contacted by Perry's production company about auditioning for a role in a new television series. Perry contacted O'Connell himself and asked him to audition over Skype. Perry then traveled to Los Angeles to meet with O'Connell about the role of Wyatt on The Haves and the Have Nots. O'Connell was actually the first of the ensemble to be cast.

In 2015, he starred in the seasonal comedy for Hallmark Channel 12 Gifts of Christmas as Marc Rehnquist, a company executive who hires a personal shopper and discovers the true spirit of Christmas is not money, and also played a leading part in A Prince for Christmas.

In 2017, he starred in Hallmark Channel’s With Love, Christmas, as 'Donovan Goodwin', with Emilie Ullerup as his co-star.

Filmography

References

External links 

 
 
 
 Aaron O'Connell, Ford Models

1986 births
People from Carmel, Indiana
21st-century American male actors
American male television actors
Purdue University College of Health and Human Sciences alumni
Living people
Male actors from Indiana
Male actors from Dayton, Ohio